The first season of The Face premiered online on February 1, 2013 and on television on February 12, 2013 on Oxygen. The premiere season followed three supermodel coaches as they competed with each other to find 'the face' of cosmetic retail giant Ulta Beauty.

Supermodel and executive producer Naomi Campbell, together with supermodels Karolina Kurkova and Coco Rocha, served as supermodel mentors for the first season. Nigel Barker, a previous judge for cycles 2 to 18 of America's Next Top Model, serve as host as well. It featured 12 aspiring contestants from the United States of America, Canada, China, Belarus, and Australia.

The winner of the competition was 21-year-old Devyn Abdullah from Bronx, New York.

Casting process 
Aspiring contestants for the show had to pre-register themselves online, and were encouraged to attend open casting calls or send in a video and application. The deadline for all applications was August 3, 2012. The show required all contestants to be 18 years old and over at the time of auditioning in order to be eligible for the program. Contestants from any country around the world could apply, as long as they had all the required documentation in order to remain in the United States for the duration of the series.

Contestants 
(Ages stated are at start of filming)

Episodes

Episode 1: The Fight to Make the Final 12 
First aired February 5, 2013

Supermodels Coco Rocha, Karolina Kurkova, and Naomi Campbell begin their search for 'The Face'. The final three teams are selected, and the hopefuls move one step closer to the ultimate prize.

Episode 2: Game On! 
First aired February 12, 2013

The final twelve move into their new loft in New York City, and they are coached through their very first campaign photo shoot by their supermodel mentors. The goal is to create an ad campaign worthy of being featured on the pages of W Magazine.

 Winning coach and team:  Karolina Kurkova
 Bottom two: Aleksandra Dubrovskaya & Stephanie Lalanne
 Eliminated: Aleksandra Dubrovskaya
 Featured Photographer: Patrick Demarchelier
 Special Guests: Bethann Hardison, Claudine Ingeneri, Stefano Tonchi

Episode 3: Model Warfare 
First aired February 19, 2013

The remaining contestants undergo a challenge for Vogue Eyewear, and pressure mounts as bickering begins to ravage Team Naomi. For the shoot, the models must perform a commercial in Cosabella lingerie with their teammates.

 Winning coach and team:  Naomi Campbell
 Bottom two: Christy Nelson & Stephanie Lalanne
 Eliminated: Christy Nelson
 Featured Videographer: Brendan O'Carroll
 Special Guests: Guido Campello

Episode 4: Falling From Grace 
First aired February 26, 2013

An unexpected turn of events sees one girl leaving the competition for good. The girls take part in their first runway show for Kleinfeld Bridal, and they must walk in couture bridal gowns on a grand staircase. After the winning team is revealed, it's goodbye for another one of the wannabe models.

 Quit: Marlee Nichols
 Winning coach and team:  Naomi Campbell
 Bottom two: Brittany Mason & Ebony Olivia Smith
 Eliminated: Brittany Mason

 Episode 5: We Are the Most Miserable Team Here 
First aired March 5, 2013

The eight remaining models prepare for a dancing challenge, and must later shoot for a Marshall's lookbook with their teammates. The arguments between Jocelyn and Sandra reach an all-time high when Naomi steps in to intervene, and a shocking elimination catches one team by surprise.

 Winning coach and team:  Naomi Campbell Bottom two: Madeline Armstrong & Stephanie Lalanne
 Eliminated: Madeline Armstrong

 Episode 6: Every Rose Has its Thorns 
First aired March 12, 2013

The hopefuls prepare for their latest test shoot challenge — shooting a commercial for Christian Louboutin shoes. Tempers flare when one model threatens to leave the competition. For the campaign, the teams must write their own scripts and direct a commercial in which they attempt to sell miscellaneous items from Opensky.com.

 Winning coach and team:  Karolina Kurkova Bottom two: Margaux Brooke Snell &  Sandra Woodley
 Eliminated: Sandra Woodley

 Episode 7: Red Carpet Ready? 
First aired March 19, 2013

The girls learn about the double elimination that will be taking place, and prepare to win the final campaign that will assure them a place in the finale. After the glitz and glamour of the red carpet and a surprise interview conducted by Wendy Williams, the winning coach must decide which two girls will be sent home. Model Pat Cleveland makes an appearance to prepare the girls for the competition.

 Winning coach and team:  Karolina Kurkova Bottom four: Jocelyn Chew, Margaux Brooke Snell, Stephanie Lalanne & Luo Zilin
 Eliminated: Jocelyn Chew & Stephanie Lalanne

 Episode 8: Finding the Face... The Finale 
First aired March 26, 2013

The remaining four contestants take part in their final shoot for ULTA beauty. One last surprise elimination sees only three of the models put through to the final task, which is walking in the runway for a Zac Posen fashion show.

 Final four: Devyn Abdullah, Ebony Olivia Smith, Margaux Brooke Snell & Luo Zilin
 Eliminated: Ebony Olivia Smith
 Final three: Devyn Abdullah, Margaux Brooke Snell & Luo Zilin
 The Face of ULTA Beauty: Devyn Abdullah
 Winning coach and team:  Karolina Kurkova

Summaries

Elimination table

  The contestant was part of the winning team for the episode.
  The contestant was at risk of elimination.
  The contestant was eliminated from the competition.
  The contestant withdrew from the competition.
  The contestant was a Runner-Up.
  The contestant won The Face.

 Episode 1 was the casting episode. The final twelve were divided into individual teams of four as they were selected.
 In episode 4, Marlee withdrew from the competition due to personal problems.
 In episode 7, both of the remaining models from the losing teams had to face Karolina for elimination. Margaux and Zi Lin were saved, while Stephanie and Jocelyn were eliminated.
 In episode 8, Zilin, Devyn, and Margaux were put through to the final runway show while Ebony was eliminated.

Campaigns
 Episode 1: Natural beauty shots; self-administered 'transformations' with accessories from DKNY (casting)
 Episode 2: Grouped in a shipyard for W Magazine
 Episode 3: Commercial with Cosabella lingerie in teams
 Episode 4: Kleinfeld bridal dress fashion show
 Episode 5: Look-books for Marshall's in teams
 Episode 6: Self-directed commercials for Opensky.com
 Episode 7: Red Carpet interviews conducted by Wendy Williams
 Episode 8: ULTA Beauty beauty shots

Television ratings

References

External links

United States, 1
2013 American television seasons